The Wuzzles is a 1985 American animated television series created for Saturday morning television, and was first broadcast on September 14, 1985 on CBS. An idea pitched by Michael Eisner for his new Disney television animation studio, the premise is that the main characters are hybrids of two different animals. The original 13 episodes ran on CBS for their first run.

Premise 
The Wuzzles features a variety of short, rounded animal characters (each called a Wuzzle). Each is a roughly even, and colorful, mix of two different animal species (as the theme song mentions, "livin' with a split personality"), and all the characters sport wings on their backs, although only Bumblelion and Butterbear are seemingly capable of flight. All of the Wuzzles live on the Isle of Wuz. Double species are not limited to the Wuzzles themselves. From the appleberries they eat to the telephonograph in the home, or a luxury home called a castlescraper, nearly everything on Wuz is mixed together in the same way that the Wuzzles are. The characters in the show were marketed extensively — featured in children's books, as poseable figures and plush toys (similar to Care Bears), and in a board game.

Disney premiered two animated series on the same day in the same time slot, 8:30 AM ET, in the United States, with the other being Disney's Adventures of the Gummi Bears on NBC, and both series were successful during their first seasons. However, The Wuzzles ended production after its initial run largely due to the sudden death of Bill Scott, the voice of Moosel. CBS canceled the show, and ABC (later acquired by Disney in 1996) picked it up and showed reruns during the 1986–1987 season; they aired it at 8:00 AM so that the two Disney shows would not be in competition with one another.

It was a bigger success in the United Kingdom, where the first episode aired as a theatrical featurette in 1986 alongside a re-release of Disney's Bambi. In the United Kingdom, The Wuzzles and Disney's Adventures of the Gummi Bears were originally screened on the same channel (ITV) in 1985/1986; therefore, both series enjoyed high popularity. Reruns of the show were aired on both the Disney Channel and Toon Disney. Songwriter Stephen Geyer performed the lead vocal and composed the theme song.

Characters 
 The Narrator (voiced by Stan Freberg): The never-seen narrator welcomes the viewer to "the Land of Wuz" and is heard throughout each episode talking about different things.
 Bumblelion (voiced by Brian Cummings): Half bumblebee and half lion, Bumblelion is mostly lion in appearance. He is a short, squat orange furred creature with a pink mane, fuzzy antennae, a lion's tail, small insect wings, and horizontal brown stripes up his tummy. He lives in a beehive, likes sports, is courageous, and has a crush on Butterbear. He is said to be the sort who "rush[es] in where angels fear to tread". He and Eleroo are best friends.
 Eleroo (voiced by Henry Gibson): Half elephant and half kangaroo. One of the larger Wuzzles, Eleroo is purple, with the body shape and tail of a kangaroo and an elephant's trunk and ears. He has a horizontally striped pouch (despite the fact that pouches are found only on female kangaroos). Eleroo has trouble remembering what he stores in his pouch. He is sweet, but accident-/disaster-prone. He and Bumblelion are best friends.
 Butterbear (voiced by Kathleen Helppie-Shipley): Half butterfly and half bear, Butterbear is mostly bear in appearance. She has yellow fur with a white tummy, larger wings than the other Wuzzles, and short antennae with flowers on their ends. She is a keen gardener who is gentle and patient despite the crazy adventures of her friends.
 Moosel (voiced by Bill Scott): Half moose and half seal, Moosel has a moose-like head with antlers, although he also sports flippers like a pinniped. Moosel, the smallest Wuzzle, is blue and purple. He has a vivid imagination, which makes him believe in monsters. He is the youngest of the Wuzzles. He and Rhinokey are best friends.
 Hoppopotamus (voiced by Jo Anne Worley): Half rabbit and half hippopotamus. She is called Hoppo by her friends. Hoppo is the largest Wuzzle. She is a hippopotamus with a rabbit's ears, buck teeth and a fluffy tail. She has blue fur with a purple tummy, and she loves to sing and act. Hoppo is a pushy demanding diva, but she can be sweet. However, when toughness is called for (particularly in dealing with the regular villain, Crocosaurus), she is the toughest Wuzzle of all. Hoppo has a crush on Bumblelion, but Bumblelion has his heart set on Butterbear.
 Rhinokey (voiced by Alan Oppenheimer): Half rhinoceros and half monkey, Rhinokey is mostly monkey in appearance. Rhinokey is a Wuzzle who has a rhino-like snout with a horizontal-stripped horn, pink fur, and rhino-like legs. He is in a posture that is very much like that of a monkey's. Rhinokey is a fun-loving, happy-go-lucky prankster. He loves to play practical jokes. He can be obnoxious, particularly with Hoppopotamus, but he loves his friends. He and Moosel are best friends.

Antagonists
 Crocosaurus (voiced by Alan Oppenheimer): Half crocodile and half dinosaur, and the main antagonist of the series. Crocosaurus (normally referred to as Crock in the series) is bad-tempered, lazy, vile, ignorant, a bully, and does anything to get what he wants. He always wants the best of what the other Wuzzles have, but does not want to apply the effort to acquire it himself.
 Brat (voiced by Bill Scott): Half wild boar, half dragon, and Crocosaurus's chief sidekick. Brat sputters, raspberries, cries, laughs, yells, growls, and grunts in his speech, but Crocosaurus always understands what he is saying. Like Crocosaurus, he is very lazy and has a strong dislike towards the other Wuzzles coupled with a desire to have the best of what they have without applying any effort towards acquiring it. As his name implies, Brat is very bad-tempered and is often shown throwing tantrums when he does not get his own way. He is also greatly lacking in intelligence, and his incompetence often sees himself and Crocosaurus falling victim to their own devices, which in turn occasionally sees the two of them falling out.
 Flizard (voiced by Brian Cummings): Half frog, half lizard, and Crocosaurus's other sidekick. Flizard is not particularly intelligent, but he means well, is more amiable in his manner than either Crocosaurus or Brat, and relatively more tolerant of the Wuzzles, but nevertheless very loyal to Crocosaurus; on occasions where Crocosaurus and Brat fall out, it is often up to Flizard to try and patch things up between them. His character essentially emphasizes tolerance of others whom one is not particularly close to, while staying loyal to one's friends regardless of whether their plans are morally right or not. Flizard does not appear in every episode, only making sporadic appearances throughout the series.

Episodes

Voices 
 Brian Cummings – Bumblelion, Flizard, Peter Parafox, Molecrab
 Stan Freberg – Narrator
 Henry Gibson – Eleroo, Girafbra
 Kathleen Helppie-Shipley – Butterbear
 Alan Oppenheimer – Rhinokey, Crocosaurus, Mr. Packcat, Pirat Captain
 Bill Scott – Moosel, Brat, Officer Eaglbeagle, Dr. P.U. Quack, Mr. Beaverbuck, Pigmouse, Chef, Mover
 Jo Anne Worley – Hoppopotamus

Additional voices 
 Gregg Berger – Tycoon
 Tress MacNeille – Mrs. Pedigree, Transylvia
 Will Ryan – Wishing Well
 Frank Welker – Mockingbirddog

Legacy 
Butterbear and Rhinokey appeared in the DuckTales episode "The Lost Cargo of Kit Cloudkicker!" Unlike their original TV series' appearances, their designs are more realistic and animalistic and Rhinokey resembles a gorilla instead of a monkey. Additionally, they were created by a relic called the Stone of What Was, which bears Bumblelion's likeness and fuses any two animals that touch it into one chimeric monstrosity.

References

External links 
 
 

1985 American television series debuts
1985 American television series endings
CBS original programming
1980s American animated television series
Fictional hybrid life forms
Disney Channel original programming
Fictional hybrids
American Broadcasting Company original programming
Television series by Disney Television Animation
American children's animated adventure television series
American children's animated fantasy television series
English-language television shows